Claire Brookin is an English professional darts player who played in British Darts Organisation (BDO) events.

Darts career
Brookin reached the quarter-finals of the World Masters in 2012 and 2015. She won the Cambridgeshire Open in 2015 and won the British Classic in 2016. She qualified for the 2017 BDO World Darts Championship, and faced the defending champion Trina Gulliver in the last 16, where she lost 2–0.

World Championship results

BDO

 2017: Last 16 (lost to Trina Gulliver 0–2)

External links
Profile and stats on Darts Database

Living people
English darts players
British Darts Organisation players
Year of birth missing (living people)
Female darts players